Betty S. Halbreich (born November 17, 1927, née Stoll) is an American personal shopper, stylist, and author known for her career at the New York luxury department store Bergdorf Goodman, where she serves as Director of Solutions. Her 2015 memoir, titled I'll Drink to That: A Life in Style, with a Twist, was featured on The New York Times Best Seller list.

Biography 
Halbreich grew up in an affluent Jewish neighborhood in the South Side of Chicago.  Her stepfather, Harry Stoll, was a businessman who ran department stores and her mother, Carol, owned a bookstore. Her family were secular German Jews who also celebrated Christmas. Her parents employed many servants at their Chicago home, including European cooks and a nursemaid. Originally she wanted to be a painter or cartoonist, and she enrolled at the Art Institute of Chicago.

While vacationing with her mother in Miami Beach, she met New York businessman Sonny Halbreich, the son of a wealthy hotel developer who owned Uwana Wash Frocks, a housecoat and bathrobe manufacturing company. In 1947 they married and she moved to Manhattan. Halbreich lived the life of a Manhattan socialite. She and her husband have two children, Kathy Halbreich and John Halbreich. After her marriage deteriorated two decades later due to her husband's drinking and infidelity, Halbreich suffered a nervous breakdown. She made a suicide attempt and was admitted to a mental institution. She and her husband never divorced, but remained separated until his death.

Upon recovery, she began seeking employment, and worked in a series of designer showrooms on Seventh Avenue and later for Chester Weinberger and Geoffrey Beene before being hired at Bergdorf Goodman in 1976 as a sale associate. On her suggestion, the  store created a personal shopping office for Halbreich. Her first client was the socialite Babe Paley. In her capacity as the director of solutions at Bergdorf's, Halbreich has served celebrity clients including Hollywood personalities, socialites, and politicians including Al Gore, Liza Minnelli, and Meryl Streep. She assisted in the styling for the cast of Sex and the City and Gossip Girl, styled casts for Broadway shows, has worked as a style consultant for Woody Allen films, collaborated with costume designers Santo Loquasto and Jeffrey Kurland, and worked with William Ivey Long, Ann Roth, and Jane Greenwood.

In 1997 she wrote the memoir Secrets of a Fashion Therapist. 2015 . In 2015 she published her second memoir, entitled I'll Drink to That: A Life in Style, with a Twist.

In 2013 she was featured in the documentary Scatter My Ashes at Bergdorf's.

She lives in an apartment on Park Avenue.

References 

Living people
American people of German-Jewish descent
American women writers
Jewish American writers
Jewish women writers
Fashion stylists
Retail clerks
Writers from Chicago
Year of birth missing (living people)
21st-century American Jews
21st-century American women